The Schöneich Tunnel is a motorway tunnel in Switzerland, and forms part of the A1L motorway in the city of Zurich between Zurich Schwamendingen and Zurich Letten.

The tunnel is around 600 metres long.

The central part of the tunnel is not fully covered.

Below the tunnel are tram lines and above are streets in the northeastern area of the city of Zurich.

Road tunnels in Switzerland
Buildings and structures in the canton of Zürich
Transport in the canton of Zürich